This is a list of Bien de Interés Cultural landmarks in the Balearic Islands.

Mallorca
 Bellver Castle
 Caves of Drach
 Gran Hotel (Palma)
 Alpara Hypostyle hall
 Son Piris Hypostyle hall
 Son Sarparets Hypostyle hall
 Na Nova
 Palma Cathedral
 Royal Palace of La Almudaina
 Valldemossa Charterhouse

Menorca
 Castle of Santa Àgueda
 Naveta d'Es Tudons
 Sant Antoni Castle
 Castillo de Amer
 Torre d'en Galmés

Ibiza
 Sant Joan de Labritja

References 

Balearic Islands
 
Bienes de Interés Cultural